Allen F. Rush (January 3, 1902January 1980) was a Michigan politician.

Early life and education
Allen was born on January 3, 1902, in Romeo, Michigan to parents Lee and Mary Rush. Allen graduated from Romeo High School and took two courses at Michigan State University.

Career
Rush was a farmer, and a member of the Michigan State Horticultural Society. From 1961 to 1962, Rush served as the delegate to the Michigan constitutional convention from the Macomb County 3rd district. On November 8, 1966, Rush was elected to the Michigan House of Representatives, where he represented the 71st district from January 11, 1967, to December 31, 1968.

Personal life
In 1930, Rushed married Jessie A. Turner. Together, they had one child. Rush was a member of the Rotary Club, but ended his membership before being elected to the state legislature. Rush was Methodist.

Death
Rush died in January 1980.

References

1902 births
1980 deaths
Methodists from Michigan
Farmers from Michigan
Republican Party members of the Michigan House of Representatives
Michigan State University alumni
People from Romeo, Michigan
Wayne State University Law School alumni
20th-century American politicians
20th-century Methodists